Massive Scar Era is an Egyptian alternative metal band. The band formed in 2004, played its first show in 2005 and is based in both Cairo, Egypt, and Canada. They have been noted for mixing heavy metal with traditional Egyptian melodies and instrumentation.

Career
Massive Scar Era formed in Alexandria in 2004, and their Egyptian fans often call them Mascara for short. The original members were singer/guitarist Cherine Amr, bassist Sarah Kasrawy, and drummer Suzie. Later in 2005, Nancy Mounir joined the band on the violin. The band immediately gained attention for its all-female membership. Suzie soon departed and the band has since experienced many lineup changes, with several men included. Their lyrics often address both political and feminist topics. 
Amr had become interested in Western heavy metal in the late 1990s, when the genre became popular in Egypt even though the police were known to round up fans for harsh questioning. Amr formed Massive Scar Era with Suzie and Sarah Kasrway. They released their debut EP Reincarnation in 2006. The band immediately gained notice for its female membership, often with criticism from family members and religious authorities; these struggles were mentioned in the internationally released book Heavy Metal Islam by Mark Levine in 2008. The band has also faced difficulty in finding gigs and record distributors in their home region due to popular disdain for aggressive music.

The Reincarnation EP gained international recognition, and the band was invited to play the Sweden Rock Festival in 2009. In 2010 they were featured in the Egyptian film Microphone, covering Alexandria's arts and music scene. Starting in 2011 the band began to play at European summer music festivals regularly. In 2013 Massive Scar Era was featured in the film Before the Spring, After the Fall, which depicted the participation of Egypt's rock musicians in that country's 2011 revolution. Cherine Amr moved to Canada in 2015 to escape her home country's criticism and harassment toward her music.

In 2018, Massive Scar Era released the EP Color Blind. In 2020, Cherine Amr adopted the name Cheen and released the folk-oriented solo single "Esmi".

Discography
EPs
 Reincarnation (2006)
 Unfamiliar Territory (2010)
 Precautionary Measures (2011)
 Comes Around You (2012)
 30 Years (2016)
 Color Blind (2018)

Videos
 "Ab3ad Makan" – ابعد مكان
 "Pray" (2012)
 "Color Blind" (2018)

References

External links
 Official Website
 Spirit of Metal website,
 Rock Era Interview

Musical groups established in 2005
Egyptian rock music groups
Heavy metal musical groups
Women's musical groups